Phone Thit Sar Min (also spelled Bhone Thitsar Min or Phone Thitsar Min, born 6 November 1997) is a Burmese professional footballer who plays as a goalkeeper for Yangon United and Myanmar U21 National Team.

Club career

Early year
Phone Thit Sar Min was a product of Myanmar Football Academy. In 2017, Shan United F.C. signed for Shan U-21 team. He became a main player and Captain of Shan United F.C. U-21 team. He showed his talent in Myanmar national under-21 football team.

Shan United
In 2018, Shan United chose Phone Thit Sar Min for 2018 Myanmar National League squad list. March 2018, he played his first professional match against Ceres–Negros at Home.

Honours

Club
Shan United 
Myanmar National League
Winners (2): 2017, 2019
Runners-up (1): 2018
General Aung San Shield
Champions (1): 2017
Runners-up (1): 2019

References

1997 births
Living people
Sportspeople from Yangon
Burmese footballers
Myanmar international footballers
Shan United F.C. players
Association football goalkeepers